The first season of the African reality television series MasterChef South Africa began on 20 March 2012 and aired on M-Net. The season judges were Pete Goffe-Wood, Andrew Atkinson and Benny Masekwameng.

Contestants

Top 18

Elimination table

 (WINNER) This chef won the competition.
 (RUNNER-UP) This chef received second place in the competition.
 (WIN) The chef won the individual challenge (Mystery Box Challenge or Invention Test) and but didn't win.
 (HIGH) The cook was one of the top entries in the (Mystery Box Challenge or Invention Test) but didn't win.
 (WIN) The chef was on the winning team in the Team Challenge and was safe from the Pressure Test.
 (CC) The chef received the advantage of competing against a celebrity chef in this challenge. If they won, they advanced farther on in the competition, skipping a number of challenges. The chef could not be eliminated after this challenge.
 (IN) The chef was not selected as a top entry or bottom entry in the challenge.
 (PT) The chef was on the losing team in the Team Challenge (except episode 8 — an Individual Challenge), competed in the pressure test, and advanced.
 (LOW) The chef was one of the bottom entries in an individual elimination challenge, but was not the last person to advance.
 (LOW) The chef was one of the bottom entries in an individual elimination challenge, and was the last person to advance.
 (ELIM) The chef was eliminated from MasterChef.

Episodes

References 

South Africa (season 1)
2012 South African television seasons